Romanian television may refer to:

 Communications media in Romania 
 Televiziunea Română, TVR, the national television network
 List of Romanian-language television channels